Muangthanhinius is a genus of adapiform primate that lived in Asia during the late Eocene.

Classification
Muangthanhinius was initially classified as incertae sedis within Adapiformes because Marivaux et al. (2006) noted its distinctness from other named adapiform families. The authors noted its similarity to Bugtilemur, questioning the latter's putative lemuriform affinities. Ni et al. (2016) recovered Muangthanhinius as part of the family Ekgmowechashalidae along with Ekgmowechashala, Bugtilemur, and Gatanthropus.

References

Literature cited

 

Prehistoric strepsirrhines
Eocene primates
Eocene mammals of Asia
Prehistoric primate genera
Fossil taxa described in 2006